Ludwig Benjamin Derleth (3 November 1870 – 13 January 1948) was a German writer and poet, known for his highly-stylized and anti-humanistic writings on spirituality and Christianity.

Life 
Derleth was born in 1870 in Gerolzhofen, Lower Franconia, Bavaria, at what is today Ludwig-Derleth-Strasse 4. He had a younger sister named Anna-Maria (1874-1955).

After studying philosophy and literature, Derleth worked as a college-level teacher of ancient languages. 

In 1898 while visiting Paris, he met the symbolist poet Stefan George. While living in Munich, he became closer to George's entourage, as well as the Munich Cosmic Circle based around Alfred Schuler and Ludwig Klages, which broke up in 1904. Derleth was the subject of verses in two cyclical poems by George: his 1907 Der Siebenten Ring ("The Seventh Ring"), and his 1914 Der Stern des Bundes ("The Star of the Covenant").

Derleth came into contact with the sculptor Georg Kolbe in Paris, and the latter began a short-lived romantic relationship with Derleth's sister Anna-Maria. Kolbe sculpted a portrait bust of Derleth in 1904.

In later years, Derleth made his living as a freelance writer in Rome, Basel, and Perchtolfsdorf (near Vienna). In Rome, on 15 March 1924, he married Christine Ulrich (born 1894 in Darmstadt), whom he had met in 1911. In 1935, he settled in Ticino, Switzerland, where he died in 1948.

Surviving her husband, Derleth's widow Christine undertook the collection, organization, and (re)publication of most of his work. Derleth's archives are now held at the Deutsches Literaturarchiv Marbach. A school in his birthplace of Gerolzhofen, the Ludwig-Derleth-Realschule, is named in his honour.

Work 

Derleth published his first poems in Stefan George's Blättern für die Kunst and in the Berlin-based arts magazine Pan. In 1904 he published his Proklamationen ("Proclamations") which called for a reformed and reorganized Catholicism based on a revolutionary, Nietzschean hierarchy and "purity". Much of Derleth's work was anti-humanistic in tone, and advocated an almost-totalitarian vision of Christianity that was both idealistic and militant in character. Proklamationen caused detractors and critics to occasionally label his work as "proto-Nazi" or fascistic.

Derleth spent 40 years completing his major work, Der fränkische Koran ("The Franconian Qur'an"), a multi-volume documentation of Derleth's own spiritual and religious journey.

It is believed that fellow author Thomas Mann's interactions with Derleth inspired his 1904 short story "Beim Propheten" ("At the Prophet's"), as well as characters in his novella Gladius Dei (1902) and Doktor Faustus (1947). 

Derleth's other works include Die Lebensalter (1937), Seraphinische Hochzeit (1939), and Der Tod des Thanatos (1945).

References

External links
 Ludwig Derleth in the Deutsches Literaturarchiv Marbach catalogue
 
 Der Tod des Thanatos by Ludwig Derleth (Lucerne: Verlag Josef Stocker, 1945) on the Internet Archive
 "Integralismus" by Hans Urs von Balthasar, 1963 essay containing excerpts from the Proklamationen
 Die Dichtung Ludwig Derleths : Einführung in das Werk by Dominik Jost (Gladenbach/Hessen: Hinder & Deelmann, 1975) on the Internet Archive

19th-century German poets
German occult writers
1870 births
1948 deaths
German male poets
19th-century German male writers
19th-century German writers
German male non-fiction writers
People from Gerolzhofen